William Idamudia Daugaard Osula (born 4 August 2003) is a Danish professional footballer who plays as a forward for  club Sheffield United.

Club career
Osula is a youth product of the Danish club Copenhagen, before moving to the youth academy of Sheffield United in 2018. On 13 July 2021, he signed his first professional contract with the club. He made his professional debut with Sheffield United in a 0–0 draw with Blackpool on 16 March 2022, coming on as a late substitute in the 91st minute.

On 1 September 2022, Osula joined Derby County on a season-long loan. On 15 October 2022, Osula made his first start for the club having already appeared four times from the bench, scoring two goals in a 3–0 victory at Accrington Stanley.

International career
Osula was born in Denmark and is of Nigerian descent, and moved to England at a young age. He was called up to a training camp for the Denmark U19s in February 2022. He debuted with the Denmark U19s in a friendly 3–2 loss to the Hungary U19s on 23 February 2022.

Career statistics

References

External links
 
 DBU Profile

2003 births
Living people
Danish men's footballers
Denmark youth international footballers
Danish people of Nigerian descent
Association football forwards
Sheffield United F.C. players
Derby County F.C. players
English Football League players
Danish expatriate men's footballers
Danish expatriates in England
Expatriate footballers in England